A display device is an output device for presentation of information in visual or tactile form (the latter used for example in tactile electronic displays for blind people). When the input information that is supplied has an electrical signal the display is called an electronic display.

Common applications for electronic visual displays are television sets or computer monitors.

Types of electronic displays

In use 
These are the technologies used to create the various displays in use today.

 Liquid crystal display (LCD)
 Light-emitting diode (LED) backlit LCD
 Thin-film transistor (TFT) LCD
 Quantum dot (QLED) display
 Light-emitting diode (LED) display
 OLED display
 AMOLED display
 Super AMOLED display

Segment displays 

Some displays can show only digits or alphanumeric characters. They are called segment displays, because they are composed of several segments that switch on and off to give appearance of desired glyph. The segments are usually single LEDs or liquid crystals. They are mostly used in digital watches and pocket calculators. Common types are seven-segment displays which are used for numerals only, and alphanumeric fourteen-segment displays and sixteen-segment displays which can display numerals and Roman alphabet letters.

Other types 
 Vacuum fluorescent display
 Electroluminescent (ELD) display
 Plasma (PDP) display

Cathode-ray tubes were also formerly widely used.

Full-area 2-dimensional displays 
2-dimensional displays that cover a full area (usually a rectangle) are also called video displays, since it is the main modality of presenting video.

Applications of full-area 2-dimensional displays 
Full-area 2-dimensional displays are used in, for example:
 Television set
 Computer monitors
 Head-mounted displays, Heads-up displays and Virtual reality headsets
 Broadcast reference monitor
 Medical monitors
 Mobile displays (for mobile devices)
 Smartphone displays (for smartphones)
 Video walls

Underlying technologies of full-area 2-dimensional displays 
Underlying technologies for full-area 2-dimensional displays include:
 Cathode ray tube display (CRT)
 Light-emitting diode display (LED)
 Electroluminescent display (ELD)
 Electronic paper, E Ink
 Plasma display panel (PDP)
 Liquid crystal display (LCD)
 High-Performance Addressing display (HPA)
 Thin-film transistor display (TFT)
 Organic light-emitting diode display (OLED)
 Digital Light Processing display (DLP)
 Surface-conduction electron-emitter display (SED) (experimental)
 Field emission display (FED) (experimental)
 Laser TV (forthcoming)
 Carbon nanotubes (experimental)
 Quantum dot display (QLED)
 Interferometric modulator display (IMOD)
 Digital microshutter display (DMS)
 microLED (in development)

The multiplexed display technique is used to drive most display devices.

Three-dimensional displays 
 Swept-volume display
 Laser display
 Holographic display
 Light field displays

Mechanical types 
 Ticker tape (historical)
 Split-flap display (or simply flap display)
 Flip-disc display (or flip-dot display)
 Vane display
 Rollsign
 Tactile electronic displays are usually intended for the blind. They use electro-mechanical parts to dynamically update a tactile image (usually of text) so that the image may be felt by the fingers.
 Optacon, using metal rods instead of light in order to convey images to blind people by tactile sensation.

See also 

 Comparison CRT, LCD, Plasma
 Graphical user interfaces
 History of display technology
 Human machine interface
 Input device
 Text display

References

External links

 Society for Information Display - An international professional organization dedicated to the study of display technology
 University of Waterloo Stratford Campus - A university that offers students the opportunity to display their work on the school's 3-storey Christie MicroTile wall.

 
Video hardware
User interfaces